Rosario Victoria Urban Medel (born 13 March 1997) is an Argentine handball player for CB Atlético Guardés and the Argentine national team .

She was selected to represent Argentina at the 2017 World Women's Handball Championship.

Formerly trained in the Sagrado Corazón Handball Club located in Florencio Varela, Buenos Aires.

References

External links

1997 births
Living people
Argentine female handball players
Expatriate handball players
Argentine expatriate sportspeople in Spain
Sportspeople from Buenos Aires
South American Games silver medalists for Argentina
South American Games medalists in handball
Competitors at the 2018 South American Games
Handball players at the 2019 Pan American Games
Pan American Games medalists in handball
Pan American Games silver medalists for Argentina
Medalists at the 2019 Pan American Games
21st-century Argentine women